Pierre Van Houdt (born 30 October 1914, date of death unknown) was a Belgian Olympic fencer. He competed at the 1952 Summer Olympics.

References

1914 births
Year of death missing
Belgian male fencers
Belgian foil fencers
Olympic fencers of Belgium
Fencers at the 1952 Summer Olympics